Jared Nathan McKenzie (born May 16, 2001) is an American professional baseball outfielder in the Washington Nationals organization.

Amateur career
McKenzie attended Round Rock High School in Round Rock, Texas, where he batted .535 with seven home runs alongside holding a 28-game hitting streak as a senior in 2019. Unselected in the 2019 Major League Baseball draft, he enrolled at Baylor University to play college baseball.

McKenzie started 16 games in center field as a freshman in 2020 and hit .406 with 28 hits before the season was cancelled due to the COVID-19 pandemic. That summer, he played in the Texas Collegiate League for the Round Rock Hairy Men. For the 2021 season, he started 51 games in center field and batted .383 with ten home runs, 44 RBIs, and 14 doubles. He earned All-Big 12 Conference Honors. Following the season's end, he played in the Cape Cod Baseball League with the Orleans Firebirds where he hit .226 with 36 strikeouts over thirty games. Prior to the 2022 season, McKenzie was named an All American by numerous outlets and was also unanimously named to the Preseason All-Big 12 Team. Over 54 games for the season, he batted .288 with 11 home runs and 42 RBIs. After the season, he entered the transfer portal.

Professional career
McKenzie was drafted by the Washington Nationals in the fifth round with the 141st overall selection of the 2022 Major League Baseball draft. He signed with the team for $410,500.

McKenzie made his professional debut with the Fredericksburg Nationals, hitting a home run in his first game with the team. Over seventy at-bats in 17 games, he hit .400 with two home runs, 15 RBIs, seven doubles, and 11 stolen bases.

References

External links
Baylor Bears bio

2001 births
Living people
Baseball players from Texas
Baseball outfielders
Baylor Bears baseball players
Orleans Firebirds players
Fredericksburg Nationals players